Taekwondo at the 2001 Southeast Asian Games was held in Pembandaran Pasir Gudang Indoor Stadium, Johor, Malaysia from 9 to 12 September 2001

Medalist

Men's events

Women's events

Medal table
Legend

References

External links
 
 Taekwondo in multi-sport games 

2001
2001 Southeast Asian Games events